8 cubic meter class dredger is a class of naval auxiliary ship currently in service with the People's Liberation Army Navy (PLAN). The complete name of the class is 8 cubic meter grab dredger, and it can also be used as a crane ship, capable of lifting a maximum of a hundred ton for each single lift. In 1984, PLAN Equipment and Technology department signed a contract with East Sea Shipyard to build 8 cubic meter class dredger / crane ship designed to meet requirements of Nippon Kaiji Kyokai (ClassNK).  The general designers were Mr. Xun Zhi-Liang (荀志亮) and Mr. Zhang Lin-Sheng (张林生). Construction began in December 1984, and after completion, the ship sailed to Qingdao in June 1985 for further sea trials, which were completed successfully. The following month, the ship was handed over to PLAN.

8 cubic meter class dredger in PLAN service was originally designated by a combination of two Chinese characters followed by three-digit number. The first Chinese character is Jiao (交), short for Jiao-Tong (交通, meaning traffic in Chinese). The second Chinese character is Zhua (抓), short for Zhua-Dou-Shi (抓斗, meaning grab in Chinese, because the ship is a grab dredger). However, the pennant numbers may have changed due to the change of Chinese naval ships naming convention.

References

Auxiliary ships of the People's Liberation Army Navy